Jean-Pancrace Chastel (1726-1793) was a French sculptor.

Biography

Early life
He was born in Avignon in 1726 and moved to Aix-en-Provence as a young boy.

Career

He was the first professor to teach at the School of Sculpture in Aix-en-Provence, founded in 1774.

He sculpted three fountains in Aix-en-Provence: Mule-Noir, Prêcheurs (1748) and Tanneurs (1761). He also sculpted the top of the former Corn Exchange. Some of his sculptures can be found in the Musée Granet.

Personal life
He married twice, and had a son. He died in poverty in a hospice in Aix-en-Provence.

Legacy
The Rue Jean Pancrace Chastel in Avignon is named in his honor.

Bibliography
Serge Conard, Jean-Pancrace Chastel: approche de l'oeuvre, Université, 1973, 230 pages.

References

1726 births
1793 deaths
Artists from Avignon
Artists from Aix-en-Provence
18th-century French sculptors
French male sculptors
18th-century French male artists